Dragsetmoen is a village in the municipality of Orkland in Trøndelag county, Norway.

The place is located along the river Orkla, about halfway between Storås and Bjørnli. County Road 65 goes through the hamlet.

References

Orkland
Villages in Trøndelag